The following is a list of productions by !llmind, an American hip hop producer. He has had a number of co-written and/or produced singles and studio albums reach the Billboard 200 charts since the mid-2000s, including his 2010 album Live from the Tape Deck. He has also worked with musicians such as Joell Ortiz, Symbolyc One, Skyzoo, and 50 Cent.

Chart positions

Production credits

2003-2005

2006-2010

2011-2014

2015-present

Collaboration albums

The Art of OneMind

Live from the Tape Deck

Human

Mixtapes

2008: Blaps, Rhymes & Life

2009: Blaps, Rhymes & Life, Vol II

2009: Blaps, Rhymes & Life, Vol III

2009: The Official Illmind Remix Album

2009: Blaps, Rhymes & Life, Vol IV

2011: Blaps, Rhymes & Life, Vol V

Upcoming projects
2013: No Malice & Ab-Liva - Hear Ye Him & The Truth Shall Set You Free (2013)
"Smoke & Mirrors"

See also

!llmind

References

External links
Illmind.biz

Production discographies
Discographies of American artists
Albums produced by Illmind
Hip hop discographies